Cosco Hellas is a container ship owned by Caravokyra Maritime Corp and operated by Costamare Shipping. Its port of registry is Piraeus, Greece. Cosco Hellas is a sister ship of the COSCO Beijing. Cosco Hellas has three other sisters: Cosco Ningbo, Cosco Yantian and Cosco Guangzhou. Greek Prime Minister Costas Karamanlis said on July 28, 2006, during the christening ceremony for the Chinese-leased container ship in Piraeus, that the Cosco Hellas emphasized the close bonds of friendship between the Greek and Chinese peoples in the best possible way.

On July 11, 2006 Wei Jiafu, captain of Cosco Hellas, attended China Maritime Day at the port of Shanghai. The purpose of the celebration was to honour the ten distinguished leaders in Chinese maritime industry. The event was mastered by the Vise-Minister of the Ministry of Communications of China, Xu Zuyuan.

Hull and engine
The Cosco Hellas has a length of 350 m and a beam of 43 m. It was built by Hyundai Heavy Industries in Ulsan, South Korea. It is a fully cellular container ship with a capacity of 9469 TEU, including 700 refrigerated containers. The dimensions of the Cosco Hellas are just small enough to allow to sail through the Westerschelde slaloms near Antwerp.

The Cosco Hellas is powered by a MAN-B&W 12K98MC, a 2 stroke 12 cylinder engine, capable of producing 74,760 kW. This engine drives a single fixed prop propeller that can sustain a speed of 25 kt.

References

Cargo ships of Greece
2006 ships
Ships of COSCO Shipping